Kaahalam is a 1981 Indian Malayalam film, directed by Joshiy and produced by Areefa Hassan. The film stars Prem Nazir, Nanditha Bose, Seema, and Raveendran in the lead roles. The film has musical score by A. T. Ummer.

Cast
Prem Nazir
Nanditha Bose
Seema
Raveendran
Cochin Haneefa
Kuthiravattom pappu
Balan K. Nair
Sathar
Jayamalini
Jaffer Khan
Bheeman Reghu

Soundtrack
The music was composed by A. T. Ummer and the lyrics were written by B. Manikyam, Ramachandran and K. G. Menon.

References

External links
 

1981 films
1980s Malayalam-language films
Films directed by Joshiy